The effects of Hurricane Charley in Jamaica included one fatality and at least $4.1 million in damages. Forming out of a tropical wave on August 9, 2004, Charley quickly tracked through the eastern Caribbean and attained tropical storm status on August 10. While passing south of Jamaica on August 11, the storm was upgraded to a Category 1 hurricane. Turning north, the storm impacted western Cuba as a Category 3 storm before making landfall in Florida as a strong Category 4. The storm eventually dissipated on August 15. As Charley approached Jamaica, officials issued tropical storm watches and warnings before issuing a hurricane watch. Two cruise ships were diverted from docking in Jamaica, affecting 5,700 passengers. Numerous shelters were set up across the island; however, relatively few people sought refuge in them.

Although it was only a Category 1 hurricane, Charley caused significant damage in southern Jamaica. Saint Elizabeth Parish sustained the worst damage. About 750 farmers reported damage, and at one point, flooding isolated 30 families. The only fatality in Jamaica occurred after a man attempted to rescue a family but was swept away by flood waters. Following the storm, search and rescue teams were deployed to flooded regions. Days later, officials allocated roughly $7.6 million (JMD; US$86,000) to repair damaged roads. Residents in areas that sustained severe agricultural losses also requested assistance from the government.

Background 

Hurricane Charley began as a tropical wave that moved off the west coast of Africa in early August 2004. The following day, the depression intensified into a tropical storm and was given the name Charley after entering the eastern Caribbean. Quickly tracking northwest, the small storm intensified.

Late on August 11, as Charley traveled south of Jamaica, it attained hurricane intensity, with winds reaching . The weakened Charley rapidly tracked northeast before dissipating on August 15 near Long Island, New York.

Preparations 
On August 10, the National Hurricane Center (NHC), based in Miami, Florida, issued a tropical storm watch for the entire island of Jamaica as Tropical Storm Charley intensified over the eastern Caribbean. Later that day, the watch was upgraded to a warning as the storm quickly approached the island. Early on August 11, a hurricane watch was declared for the island as Charley neared hurricane intensity. Late on August 11, all watches and warnings for Jamaica were changed to hurricane warnings as Charley attained Category 1 status on the Saffir–Simpson hurricane scale. The warning was later discontinued on August 12 as Hurricane Charley tracked towards Cuba, no longer a threat to Jamaica.

Following the issuance of hurricane watches, Robert Pickersgill, Minister of Transport and Works in Jamaica closed both airports, Norman Manley International Airport and Sangster International Airport, on the island and shut down all ports. A total of 33 flights were canceled or delayed by the storm. Roughly 3,000 passengers from the Carnival Conquest cruise ship were diverted from their scheduled arrival in Montego Bay, resulting in millions of dollars in losses. Another cruise ship, The Triumph, carrying 2,700 passengers was also diverted. Most businesses on the island were closed on August 12. Emergency shelters were set up across the island ahead of the storm; however, press reports indicate that no one sought refuge in shelters. Residents along the coast were urged to evacuate by the Office of Disaster Preparedness and Emergency Management due to the risk of storm surge and large swells that could inundate low-lying communities.

On August 11, the Jamaica Red Cross opened its Emergency Operations Center in preparation for Hurricane Charley and placed the warning level at one, the lowest warning level. Residents throughout the country stocked up on emergency supplies and non-perishable food, noted by an increase in sales at shops. In Saint James Parish, emergency officials activated all necessary agencies by August 11. Late on August 11, emergency officials quickly opened 50 shelters in the parish. In Saint Elizabeth Parish, 100 residents sought refuge in the six shelters opened throughout the parish. A total of $1.5 million (JMD; US$17,000) was allocated by the Ministry of Local Government for repairs after the storm. The Jamaica Red Cross alerted local branches to be prepared as Charley approached.

Impact and aftermath 
The Jamaica Defence Force Coast Guard rescued the crew members the following day and brought them to Kingston Public Hospital as they were severely dehydrated and exhausted. During the preparations, storms ahead of the hurricane knocked out power in isolated areas. After nearly completing restoration of the initial power outage, lightning struck a power line and left more residents without electricity.

The community of Big Woods was significantly affected by flooding, with 30 families being isolated in the area. The only fatality from the storm also occurred in this community after a man was washed away while trying to rescue a family. The severity of damage in Big Woods prompted Jamaica Labour Party Area Council Four chairman to state that it should be declared a disaster area. Torrential rains during a two-hour span overnight triggered most of the flooding in the area, isolating many homes and inundating several. In Westmoreland Parish, severe flooding inundated several homes and damaged roadways. One home sustained significant damage after a large tree fell on it. In Kingston, high winds damaged power lines and some homes. Water supply to most regions was cut due to damage to pipelines and high water turbidity. Widespread power outages occurred due to numerous downed trees and power lines.

The banana industry sustained severe losses, with trees downed and fruit damaged and numerous livestock drowned in flood waters. Initial assessments of agricultural losses from the storm reached $300 million (JMD; US$3.4 million). Residents requested the government for immediate assistance as families were without a source of food and income. Official assessments in four parishes placed the damage to agriculture and livestock at $88.4 million (JMD; US$1 million), with roughly $73.5 million (JMD; US$835,000) of this accounting for 750 farmers in Saint Elizabeth.

Roads in Saint Elizabeth sustained substantial damage, with 32 separate roads experiencing severe impacts. Throughout the country, a total of $7.6 million (JMD; US$86,000) was provided to repair the roads, $4.23 million (JMD; US$48,000) of which was used in Saint Elizabeth alone. Widespread damage to crops also resulted in an increased price in store costs. The loss to farmers was untimely as it followed a three-month drought that was preceded by damaging hailstorms that ruined crops. Following the storm, search and rescue teams were deployed, mainly in Saint Elizabeth Parish following reports of flooding.

See also 

 Hurricane Charley
 Effects of Hurricane Ivan in Jamaica
 2004 Atlantic hurricane season

References

External links 
 

Jamaica
Charley Effects
2004 Atlantic hurricane season
2004 in Jamaica
Charley
Charley Jamaica